Aaron Harper (born March 12, 1981) is an American professional basketball player for Huracanes de Tampico of the Liga Nacional de Baloncesto Profesional (LNBP). He usually plays as swingman, playing on both shooting guard and small forward positions. He is a graduate of the Ole Miss basketball program.

College career
Harper played college basketball for Ole Miss from 2000 to 2004. In his senior year he was the schools leading scorer with 16.5 points.

Professional career
Harper signed with Úrvalsdeild karla club KR in end of December 2004, playing his first games in January 2005. After a difficult first half of the season for KR, Harper's arrival changed the team's fortunes for the better, helping them win 7 of their last 11 games and making the playoffs. In the playoffs, the faced Snæfell in the first round. In the first game of the series, Harper helped KR rally from a 14-point deficit and scored the go-ahead three pointer with seven second left, securing KR's 91–89 victory. Snæfell tied the series in the next game and in the third and deciding game of the series, Snæfell pulled away for a 116–105 victory despite Harper's 35 points.

References

External links
RealGM profile
Úrvalsdeild stats at kki.is

1981 births
Living people
African-American basketball players
American expatriate basketball people in Argentina
American expatriate basketball people in Bulgaria
American expatriate basketball people in France
American expatriate basketball people in Iceland
American expatriate basketball people in Lebanon
American expatriate basketball people in Mexico
American expatriate basketball people in Ukraine
American expatriate basketball people in Venezuela
American men's basketball players
Basketball players from Jackson, Mississippi
BC Azovmash players
BC Levski Sofia players
Chorale Roanne Basket players
Élan Béarnais players
Ferro Carril Oeste basketball players
Guaros de Lara (basketball) players
Huracanes de Tampico players
KR men's basketball players
Marinos B.B.C. players
Ole Miss Rebels men's basketball players
Panteras de Miranda players
Quimsa basketball players
Trotamundos B.B.C. players
Úrvalsdeild karla (basketball) players
Small forwards
Shooting guards
Sagesse SC basketball players
Al Riyadi Club Beirut basketball players
21st-century African-American sportspeople
20th-century African-American people